The first round of the Women's team kumite competition at the 2018 World Karate Championships was held on 8 November 2018, the preliminaries and repechages on 9 November and the finals on 11 November 2018.

Results

Finals

Repechage

Pool A

Pool B

Pool C

Pool D

References

External links
Draw

Women's team kumite